Wittenbach railway station is a railway station in Wittenbach, in the Swiss canton of St. Gallen. It is an intermediate stop on the Bodensee–Toggenburg line and is served by local trains only.

Services 
Wittenbach is served by the S1 and S82 of the St. Gallen S-Bahn:

 : half-hourly service between Schaffhausen and Wil via St. Gallen.
 : rush-hour service to St. Gallen.

References

External links 
 
 

Railway stations in the canton of St. Gallen
Südostbahn stations